Edwin Ellis Woodman (June 1, 1838August 29, 1912) was an American engineer and Republican politician.  He was a member of the Wisconsin State Senate, representing Juneau and Sauk counties in the 1880 and 1881 sessions.

Biography
Edwin Woodman was born in St. Louis, Missouri, on June 1, 1838.  He was raised and educated in St. Louis until the death of his father in 1853.  He and his mother then moved to Monroe, Wisconsin, where he completed his education and began his interest in engineering, studying under Joseph Thompson Dodge.  He briefly attended the University of Wisconsin to improve his understanding of higher mathematics, but could not afford to continue his studies.  He took up teaching in order to finance his further education, but his work was interrupted by the outbreak of the American Civil War.

He helped raised a company of volunteers for service in the Union Army and was elected their captain.  His company was enrolled as Company B in the 13th Wisconsin Infantry Regiment.  He served a full three year enlistment, but for much of the time he was detailed as an engineering aide on the staff of Brigadier General Robert S. Granger and later Major General Lovell Rousseau.

After leaving federal service, he returned to Monroe, where he was employed as principal of the high school.  He was soon hired as an engineer on railroad projects, but the work mostly dried up in the Panic of 1873.  At that time, he went to work as an editor for a weekly newspaper—the Baraboo Republic.  He was publisher of the paper for six years, during which time he was granted an honorary engineering degree from the University of Wisconsin.

In 1879, he was elected to the Wisconsin State Senate, running on the Republican Party ticket.  He represented the 14th State Senate district, which then comprised Juneau and Sauk counties.

At the end of his two year term, he returned to the railroad industry, working on the Chicago & North Western Railway Company.  In 1884, he was elected secretary of the Chicago, St. Paul, Minneapolis and Omaha Railway.  He worked in that role until he was compelled to retire in 1907 due to poor health.

His health never fully recovered and he died at his summer home in Shell Lake, Wisconsin, in August 1912.

Near the end of his life, he published a narrative called Damien and Dutton which focused on the story of Joseph Dutton, who had served with Woodman in the 13th Wisconsin Infantry and spent the rest of his life working as a Catholic missionary with Father Damien in Hawaii, ministering to the leper colony on Molokai.

Electoral history

Wisconsin Senate (1879)

| colspan="6" style="text-align:center;background-color: #e9e9e9;"| General Election, November 4, 1879

Published works

References

External links

The Political Graveyard

Politicians from St. Louis
Politicians from Janesville, Wisconsin
People from Monroe, Wisconsin
People from Baraboo, Wisconsin
Republican Party Wisconsin state senators
People of Wisconsin in the American Civil War
Union Army officers
1838 births
1912 deaths
People from Shell Lake, Wisconsin